Anybots Inc. is an American robotics company based in Santa Clara, California. It was founded in 2001 by Trevor Blackwell.

History
The company was incorporated as Anybots Inc. by Trevor Blackwell in 2001. David Rogan later became CEO in July 2012.

Robotic Products

Q(X) 

Q(X) (also known as the QX) is the latest robot from Anybots. It supports a 21-inch display, or 1 or 2x  15.6-inch screens. It provides 1080p60 High Definition video conferencing, 64x zoom camera, and crystal clear audio. Q(X) works with a Polycom Group 500 video conferencing system as supporting standard H.323 and SIP video conferencing.
 
Its modular design allows for customer-specified payloads and alternate conferencing systems to be included.

QB 

QB is a two-wheeled, gyroscopically stabilized remote telepresence unit driven via web browser. The user can select one of a range of bots located around the world, and drive it off from the Anybots website. All that is needed onsite is power, Wi-Fi or 3G/4G. On board is a touch screen display, speaker and microphone plus a laser for pointing at objects.
 
Applications include marketing, remote experts, a remote lobby service (where receptionists can remotely ‘bot in’ to greet and guide clients), museum guides, education, and translation services in airports and public spaces, remote property tours provided to foreign clients by real estate agents (engendering trust in that the client can drive them-self around), mobile exhibition attendants and security patrols, as well as the more mundane business meeting presence.

It may also be useful for the handicapped, severely disabled, and sick children.

Anybots can be purchased in the United States, Japan, and Europe.

QA 
QA, which debuted at the 2009 Consumer Electronics Show, is the first of Anybots' two telepresence Robots. The user connects to QA via Wi-Fi.

The robot was never produced commercially.

Dexter 
Dexter is a dynamically balancing bipedal humanoid robot research project. It is learning to walk and can jump, with its feet clearing the ground for a third of a second. Because it uses pneumatics as actuators, its joints are compliant and provide a springy restoring force, much like a human's tendons, allowing it much greater capability to deal with obstacles.

Monty 

Monty is a telemanipulation prototype. It picks things up with an 18 degree of freedom hand and is operated remotely through the use of a suit that includes a special glove.

References

External links

 
 
 What is an Anybot? (video)
 

Electronics companies of the United States
Robotics companies of the United States
Technology companies established in 2001
Companies based in Mountain View, California
Telepresence robots